Iain Sydie (born November 12, 1969 in North York, Ontario) is a badminton player from Canada, who won the silver medal in the inaugural men's singles competition at the 1995 Pan American Games. He also took away a gold from that tournament. A resident of Calgary, Alberta, he represented Canada at the 1996 Summer Olympics. Together with his mixed doubles partner Denyse Julien, they become the first North American players to gain a top ten world ranking in February 1998.

References
 Canadian Olympic Committee
 Canada Mixed Doubles Pair Breaks into World Top Ten

External links
 
 
 
 
 
 

1969 births
Living people
Badminton players at the 1996 Summer Olympics
Canadian male badminton players
Olympic badminton players of Canada
Sportspeople from Calgary
Sportspeople from North York
Badminton players at the 1995 Pan American Games
Badminton players at the 1999 Pan American Games
Pan American Games gold medalists for Canada
Pan American Games silver medalists for Canada
Pan American Games medalists in badminton
Badminton players at the 1994 Commonwealth Games
Badminton players at the 1998 Commonwealth Games
Commonwealth Games competitors for Canada
Medalists at the 1995 Pan American Games
Medalists at the 1999 Pan American Games